Šilai Eldership is a Lithuanian eldership, located in an eastern part of Jonava District Municipality. As of 2020, administrative centre and largest settlement within eldership was Šilai.

Geography
 Rivers: Lokys;

Populated places 
Following settlements are located in the Šilai Eldership (as for 2011 census):

Towns: Panoteriai
Villages: Aklasis Ežeras, Balėnai, Bareišiai, Bazilioniai, Bogušiai, Butkūnai, Gedgaudai, Gegutė, Gudoniai, Gudžioniai, Ilgabradai, Jadvygava, Jasudai, Jaugeliškiai, Kaušanka, Konceptas, Konciapolis, Kulšiškiai, Laukagaliai, Liepos, Linksmavietė, Lokėnėliai, Lokys, Lukšiai, Makaronka, Mankūnai, Markutiškiai, Milagainiai, Mogeniai, Paberžė, Pagečiai, Palokis I, Palokis II, Pasiekai, Pasoda, Piliakalniai, Prauliai, Pupkuliai, Pūstelninkai, Satkūnai, Stašiūnai, Stoškai, Šemetiškiai, Šiaudinė, Šilai, Tabala, Tarakėliai, Taukadažiai, Užmiškiai, Vainiai, Varpėnai, Vatėnaia

Demography

References

Elderships in Jonava District Municipality